Matin Balesini known as Matin Balsini (born 19 February 2001 in Tehran) is an Iranian swimmer. He competed in the Tokyo 2020 Summer Olympics. Matin is currently training with the University of Surrey in the UK, under coach Lee Spindlow and strength & conditioning coach Jordan Niblock.

References

2001 births
Living people
Swimmers at the 2020 Summer Olympics
Iranian male swimmers
Olympic swimmers of Iran
People associated with the University of Surrey